The State House in Nauru is the official residence of the president of the Republic of Nauru. It was formerly a detention centre for detainees from Australia. Located in the Anetan District, in the northern part of the country, the State House is currently home to President Russ Kun.

Government buildings in Nauru
Presidential residences